Love Creek is a  long 3rd order tributary to Rehoboth Bay, in Sussex County, Delaware.  Except for the part in Goslee Millpond, the creek is entirely tidal.

Course
Love Creek is formed at the confluence of Goslee Creek and Bundicks Branch within Goslee Millpond in Sussex County, Delaware.  Love Creek then flows southeast to meet Rehoboth Bay about 0.1 miles south of Old Landing.

The Love Creek Bridge clearance is 8'7" at low tide and 6' at high tide. The pier water depth is 5' at high tide and 2'6" at low tide.

Watershed
Love Creek drains  of area, receives about 45.3 in/year of precipitation, has a topographic wetness index of 623.30 and is about 20.8% forested.

See also
List of rivers of Delaware

References 

Rivers of Delaware